Plonévez-du-Faou is a commune in the Finistère department of Brittany in north-western France.

Geography

Climate
Plonévez-du-Faou has a oceanic climate (Köppen climate classification Cfb).

Population
Inhabitants of Plonévez-du-Faou are called in French Plonévéziens.

See also
Communes of the Finistère department
Calvary at Saint-Herbot near Plonévez-du-Faou and the Chapelle Saint-Herbot.
List of works of the two Folgoët ateliers

References

External links

Official website

Mayors of Finistère Association 

Communes of Finistère